The St. Gregory the Great Parish Church (Filipino: Simbahan ng Parokya ni San Gregorio Magno), commonly known as Indang Church, is a Roman Catholic church in the municipality of Indang, Cavite, Philippines, under the Roman Catholic Diocese of Imus.

Church history 
Indang, originally Indan, was originally a chapel (or visita) of Silang under the Jesuits. The church's historical marker stated that the church was established as a mission station of Father Angelo Armano in 1611 and a separate parish in 1625 under the advocacy of St. Gregory the Great.  Even before it became a full-pledged parish, the parish had established devotion to St. Francis Xavier.  A huge part of the stone church was built during the term of Father Luis Morales from 1672 to 1676 and was finished on 1710.  Diocesan priests served the parish starting in 1768 and it was later transferred to the Dominicans in 1891. The church was burned during the Philippine revolution against the Spaniards.  It was restored under the auspices of Msgr. Mauro de Leon in 1953 and Father Cornelio Matanguihan in 1987.

Features 
Upon entering the church, elegantly carved doors will be seen first together with the impressive carvings on the choir loft balcony. Built during the 18th century, it has an impressive rose-colored trompe l'oil paintings on its ceiling. Several commemorative gravestones can also be seen in the walls and pillars of the church. The retablo has three levels of niches for images of saints. Unlike the elegant rose-colored ceiling, restoration works on the retablo involved repainting, with red and gold. At the central niche is the image of the town's patron, St. Gregory the Great. Located at the right side of the altar is a painting of St. Michael and the Archangels. The pulpit of the church carries the Jesuit monogram surmounted by the image of the Christ child  as a sign of being a parish under the Jesuits before the Suppression of the Society of Jesus of 1768.

The church of Indang was one of the first churches in Cavite to use galvanized iron as its roofing in 1869. The adjacent old convent has wide windows and wrought iron work along the sides.

Devotions 

Indang was dedicated under the chaplaincy of Pope St. Gregory the Great (also San Gregorio Magno). In one incident, the local parish priest found a big, rolled picture at the back of the church together with burnt trash. It was found out to be a painting of the seven archangels. Since then, the devotion to the archangels also grew in the town together with the intercession of St. Gregory the Great giving the parish of Indang eight patrons. The icon of the archangels is currently found at the right side of the altar. Several miracles are attributed to St. Gregory and the seven archangels including the peaceful stay of the Japanese soldiers during the war and a failed attempt to raid the town, by bandits.

References

External links 

Marked Historical Structures of the Philippines
Roman Catholic churches in Cavite
Churches in the Roman Catholic Diocese of Imus